MyOutdoorTV.com is an internet television channel that provides streaming TV shows and product demonstrations to hunters, shooting sports enthusiasts, anglers, campers, boaters, and hikers. It is the largest online video network catering to outdoor programming.

MyOutdoorTV.com carries many outdoor-related cable shows that air on Outdoor Channel and Sportsman Channel via the online video channel.

Access is $9.99 per month to all programming. The channel has been described as the Netflix of the hunting world.

History
The channel was launched in 2006 by David Hall and Chris Moise, former programming executives from TNN and CMT and at launch featured programming hosted by Hank Parker, Mark Sosin, Jimmy Houston, Larry Csonka, Roland Martin, Babe Winkelman, and others as well as a dozen radio shows and links to more than 150 outdoor blogs including a viewer created encyclopedia called "MyOutdoorWiki". It was acquired by Outdoor Channel in 2011. Outdoor Channel was later acquired by Kroenke Sports & Entertainment where the channel was made part of its Outdoor Sportsman Group collection.

MyOutdoorTV.com which was originally headquartered in Tennessee is now headquartered in Denver, Colorado, part of the Kroenke Sports & Entertainment family of companies.

Controversy
The channel stirred controversy upon launch in the United Kingdom on July 31, 2017, where Kroenke owns part the Premier League team Arsenal for its showing of "blood sports". The channel was condemned by British animal rights groups. My Outdoor TV defended its programming "MOTV will present ethical, fair chase hunting and as long as it's legal it will be on there." "If you like hunting elephants, there will be legal elephant hunts, ethical elephant hunts, shown in that context."

References

External links
 MyOutdoorTV
 The Tennessean article on MyOutdoorTV
 Business Wire article on MyOutdoorTV

Video on demand services
Internet properties established in 2006
Sports television networks in the United States
Companies based in Denver
Internet television channels
Outdoor recreation
Kroenke Sports & Entertainment